Kristien Hemmerechts (born 27 August 1955) is a Belgian writer.

Life

Kristien Hemmerechts studied Germanic philology at the Katholieke Universiteit Brussel (KUB) and the Katholieke Universiteit Leuven (KUL). Afterwards, she studied literary science in Amsterdam for a year. In Amsterdam she met her first husband—who was British—with whom she married in 1978. They moved out to London where Hemmerechts worked as a typist. In 1979 they were in charge of  a youth hostel in Dover. After a half year, they left Dover and they started traveling in South America for another half year. When they returned, they settled in Brussels where Hemmerechts took upon a mandate at the KUB as an instructor of English.

In 1981 Hemmerechts gave birth to a daughter, named Katherine. Two sons followed shortly after that, but both boys died from Sudden infant death syndrome (SIDS).

In 1986 she was granted a PhD for her dissertation A Plausible Story and a Plausible Way of Telling It: A structuralist analysis of Jean Rhys's novels.

In 1987 she divorced her husband. A year later she met the Flemish writer and poet Herman de Coninck with whom she lived in Berchem, Antwerp. In 1992 they got married. Five years later, in 1997, Herman de Coninck died from a heart failure in Lisbon, Portugal. Hemmerechts reported about this loss in the biographical Taal Zonder Mij (1998) which also contains some analyses of de Coninck's poetry.

In 2007, Kristien Hemmerechts married Bart Castelein, with whom she has had a relationship since 1999. Until this day they haven't lived together, deciding for separate homes.

Hemmerechts currently is a professor in English literature at the Katholieke Universiteit Brussel (KUB), and an instructor of Creative Writing at the Herman Teirlinck Instituut in Antwerp.

Work

Kristien Hemmerechts published her debut in 1986 with the collection First Fictions, Introduction 9 which was written in English. Her first novel Een Zuil van Zout was published in 1987. It received the Prijs van de provincie Brabant. In 1990 she received the prestigious Vlaamse driejaarlijkse Staatsprijs voor proza. A recurring theme in Hemmerechts' work is man's incapability to give direction in life. Characters are faced with the incapability of communicating with others which leads to the inability of creating meaningful human relationships. Causes are to be sought in feelings of estrangement from the world and the self, loneliness and guilt.

In a lot of her work, Hemmerechts depicts sexuality from a female point of view. Explicit scenes are the foundation of accusations that say Kristien Hemmerechts deliberately wants to provoke her readers. Her style is a distant one that registers accounts and thought. She shows rather than participates as a narrator in her story lines.

Bibliography
Een zuil van zout (A pillar of salt), 1987 (novel)
Weerberichten, 1988 (short stories)
Brede heupen, 1989 (novel)
's Nachts (Evenings), 1989 (short stories)
Zonder Grenzen, 1991 (novel)
Kerst en andere liefdesverhalen, 1992 (short stories)
Wit zand (White sand), 1993 (novel)
Lang geleden, 1994 (memoir)
Amsterdam Retour, 1995 (travelogue)
Veel vrouwen, af en toe een man, 1995 (novel)
Kort kort lang, 1996 (short stories)
Margot en de engelen, 1997 (novel)
Taal zonder mij, 1998
De tuin der onschuldigen, 1999 (novel)
De kinderen van Arthur (Arthur's children), 2000 (novel)
O, toen alles nog voorbij kon gaan, 2000 (short stories)Donderdagmiddag. Halfvier. (Thursday afternoon. Half past four), 2002 (novel)Een jaar als (g)een ander, 2003 (diary)De laatste keer, 2004 (novel)V, notities bij een reis naar Vietnam, 2004 (travelogue)De waar gebeurde geschiedenis van Victor en Clara Rooze, 2005 (novel)Als een kinderhemd'', 2006 (memoir)

Sources
 Kristien Hemmerechts (K.U. Brussel)
  Kristien Hemmerechts

1955 births
20th-century Belgian novelists
Belgian women novelists
Living people
Flemish women writers
International Writing Program alumni
21st-century Belgian novelists
Belgian women short story writers
Belgian short story writers
Belgian memoirists
Belgian erotica writers
Women erotica writers
20th-century short story writers
21st-century short story writers
20th-century Belgian women writers
21st-century Belgian women writers
Women memoirists